was a Japanese writer.

Biography
Jun'ichi Watanabe was born in Kamisunagawa, Hokkaido, Japan. His starting point as a literate was the death of a classmate who was his first love in high school. He published his first works while still studying at Sapporo Medical University, where he graduated in 1958. He specialised in orthopedic surgery, while at the same time writing medical, historical, and biographical novels. Following the scandal about the first heart transplant operation performed in Japan in 1968, which became known as the "Wada incident", Watanabe left his medical profession and concentrated on writing. 

Watanabe wrote more than 50 novels in total, and won awards including the 1970 Naoki Prize for Hikari to kage (lit. "Light and shadow"), and the Yoshikawa Eiji Prize in 1979 for Toki rakujitsu ("The Setting Sun in the Distance) and Nagasaki roshia yujokan ("The Russian brothel of Nagasaki"). He gained wide attention with a series of sexually explicit novels, including the 1997 bestseller A Lost Paradise, which was made into a film and a TV miniseries.

He died on 30 April 2014 of prostate cancer in Tokyo.

Works in English translation
 1969: Invitation to Suicide (Jisatsu no susume). In: Autumn Wind and Other Stories
 1970: Beyond the Blossoming Fields (Hanauzumi)
 1997: A Lost Paradise (Shitsurakuen)

References

External links
 Junichi Watanabe's literature house 
 

Japanese writers
1933 births
2014 deaths
Deaths from prostate cancer
Deaths from cancer in Japan
Japanese erotica writers
Naoki Prize winners
Writers from Hokkaido